The Presidency of the Council of Ministers is the cabinet department of the Government of Portugal. Its mission is to provide support to the Council of Ministers, the Prime Minister and the other members of the cabinet organically integrated in the department. It is also responsible for the promotion of inter-ministerial coordination of the various government departments, and it integrates miscellaneous services that are in the direct dependence of the Prime Minister or that do not sit well in other departments.

The department is headed by the Minister of the Presidency, who is generically responsible for the coordination of inter-ministerial policies and objectives. The current Minister of the Presidency, since 2019, is Mariana Vieira da Silva.

The Minister of the Presidency often takes on responsibility for areas of policy which are the priority of the Government of the time. At present, the Organic Law of the XXIII Constitutional Government charges the Minister of the Presidency with policy in the area of public administration, namely the management of and modernisation of the civil service and public services, as well as oversight of European territorial cohesion policy programmes.

Currently, the Minister in the Cabinet of the Prime Minister and of Parliamentary Affairs, who lacks a ministerial department of their own, also operates under the Presidency of the Council of Ministers; in the XXIII Constitutional Government, the Minister is not only tasked with liaising between the Cabinet and the Assembly of the Republic, but also with global policy in the areas of civic engagement and social equality, with a specific focus on violence against women, domestic abuse and migration governance, as well as the national policy on youth and sports. The current Minister in the Cabinet of the Prime Minister and for Parliamentary Affairs, since 2022, is Ana Catarina Mendes.

History 
The Presidency of the Council of Ministers grew as an executive superstructure with the beginning of the Estado Novo regime, especially after the Constitution of 1933 came into force, as a mechanism to centralise political power and reinforce government authority. The 1950s and 1960s saw a growing government bureaucracy to overcome the new challenges in economic policy, public safety and national defence, in the context of the post-war international situation, of Portugal's NATO membership, and of the Colonal War.

In 1950, in the context of a government reshuffle, the new position of Minister of the Presidency was created; the Minister was responsible for the oversight and management of the services directly dependent of the Prime Minister (at the time known by the official title of "President of the Council of Ministers").

Since then, the position of Minister of the Presidency ceased to be in use in four distinct periods: 1961–1987, 1995, 1997–1999, and 2011–2013. In other periods, the position changed its name due to the incumbent accumulating further responsibilities: between 2013 and 2015, it was called Minister of the Presidency and Parliamentary Affairs (Ministro da Presidência e dos Assuntos Parlamentares), briefly, in 2015, it was called Minister of the Presidency and Regional Development (Ministro da Presidência e do Desenvolvimento Regional), between 2015 and 2019, Minister of the Presidency and Administrative Modernisation (Ministro da Presidência e da Modernização Administrativa), and, between 2019 and 2022, Minister of State and the Presidency (Ministra de Estado e da Presidência).

Current organisation 
In accordance with the Organic Law of the XXIII Constitutional Government, the Presidency of the Council of Ministers comprises the following members of the Government:

 Prime Minister
 Secretary of State for Digitalisation and Administrative Modernisation
 Minister of the Presidency
 Secretary of State for the Presidency of the Council of Ministers
 Secretary of State for Planning
 Secretary of State for Public Administration
 Minister in the Cabinet of the Prime Minister and for Parliamentary Affairs
 Secretary of State for Equality and Migration
 Secretary of State for Youth and Sports

Services currently integrated under the Presidency of the Council of Ministers are as follows:

 Secretariat-General of the Presidency of the Council of Ministers (Secretaria-Geral da Presidência do Conselho de Ministros)
 National Bureau of Security (Gabinete Nacional de Segurança)
 Centre for Legal Competences of the State (Centro de Competências Jurídicas do Estado)
 Centre for Planning, Policy and Foresight in Public Administration (Centro de Competências de Planeamento, de Políticas e de Prospetiva da Administração Pública - PlanAPP)
 Management Centre for the Electronic Government Network (Centro de Gestão da Rede Informática do Governo)
 Commission for Citizenship and Gender Equality (Comissão para a Cidadania e a Igualdade de Género)
 National Institute of Statistics (Instituto Nacional de Estatística)
 High Commissariat for Migrations (Alto Comissariado para as Migrações)
 Agency for the Integrated Management of Rural Fires (Agência para a Gestão Integrada de Fogos Rurais)
 Agency for Administrative Modernisation (Agência para a Modernização Administrativa)
 Agency for Development and Cohesion (Agência para o Desenvolvimento e Coesão)
 Portuguese Institute for Sports and Youth (Instituto Português do Desporto e Juventude)

The Presidency of the Council of Ministers also provides support to the dependent services of the Prime Minister, as well as those of the Minister of the Presidency, Minister in the Cabinet of the Prime Minister and for Parliamentary Affairs, Minister of Culture, Minister of Infrastructure and Housing, and the Minister of Territorial Cohesion.

External links

References

Premiership
Portugal